The NFL's Quarterback Challenge , created by the Challenge Group, LLC, was an annual competition of National Football League quarterbacks, sponsored in part by DirecTV, produced by NFL Players Inc. and NFL QB Greats. The first NFL Quarterback Challenge took place in 1990 on the island of Kauai. Previously it was sponsored by 989 Sports and in 2005 by Electronic Arts EA Sports.

Each of the quarterback challenges had different events that would test each quarterback's skills, with points being given to each quarterback. Whichever quarterback had the most points at the end of all the events, would win the challenge, with rewards also given to the quarterback who won each event. The events included the following:

Speed and Mobility : 
Penalties for knocking over obstacles and missing targets
Bonus for hitting the bullseye or inner ring
Top two advance to the final round
QBC 7.61 seconds (Rick Mirer, 1995)

For this event, each quarterback would go run a slalom-like course, where they would have to run around cones, past cardboard cutouts of defenders, and a jump over a small hurdle and throw a pass at a target. Depending on where the target was hit by the football, the quarterback would have fractions of a second deducted from their overall time, such as .5 seconds being deducted if the quarterback hits the bullseye, or .25 seconds if they hit the outer ring of the target. The fastest time, including the deductions, was the winner.
Course outline:
1st Duck back right, run around the cone
2nd through ring
3rd run left 
4th run right right 
5th over hurdle 
6th throw into ring; red = 0.5 bonus, white = 0.25 bonus, grey = 0.00 
 
Accuracy: 
30 seconds to complete the course, closer to bullseye = higher score. 
Highest possible score - 84 points
QBC record - Troy Aikman, 70 points (1995)
1st cart; 6, 8, 10 points over 3 balls, cart cutting diagonal right to left like a post route
Max score 30
2nd group; 6, 8, 10 points over 3 balls, cart cutting left to right like an in route 
Max score 30
3rd group; 12,18 24 points over 1 ball, deep post about 40 yards 
Max score 24 
All cart movements are inverted opposite for lefty QBs
 
Long Distance: Each quarterback tries to throw a football as far as they can, with the quarterbacks with the top three distances getting a chance to try again. The quarterbacks also have to keep the balls in bounds, or their throws wouldn't count. The winner of the event was the quarterback with the longest pass.
Better of 2 throws count
IF tie, 1 throw shoot out
2 points awarded every yard past 50 yards
QBC record - Vinny Testaverde, 80 yards (1988)

Read & Recognition: Each quarterback throws a football at moving targets, but only the targets designated by a yellow flag, with each quarterback having four attempts.

If tie, 1 throw shootout
Highest possible score: 192
4 attempts aiming for short, medium or long targets
Short; 6,8,12		
one from left, one from right crossing
Medium; 18,27,36 	
one from left, one from right crossing 
Long; 30,45,60 
(2 chances only) 
 
QBC record - Neil O'Donnell (1996) & Brett Favre (1997), 111 points

Video games
NFL-licensed NFL Quarterback Challenge, created by ProAppSports and produced by Adisoft Studios is currently available on Apple's iPhone and iPod Touch devices. An officially NFL-licensed Quarterback Challenge appeared in 2 other different console video games.  Both video game versions appeared in the same Quarterback Club series of games by Acclaim Entertainment.  The Quarterback Challenge mode appeared in the first and last versions of the game series.  The first was in the original Quarterback Club game released in 1994 on the Super Nintendo Entertainment System and Sega Genesis.  The second and final appearance of the challenge was in NFL QB Club 2002, published in 2001 for the PlayStation 2 and GameCube.  The first version was a sprite-based 2D game, while the later version was fully 3D.  Both of these games and all games in this series were developed by Iguana Entertainment in Austin, Texas. The 1994 SNES/Genesis version was produced by Russell Byrd.  The 2001 PS2/GameCube version was produced by Charles Normann.

Discontinued
In November 2007 NFL cancelled Quarterback Challenge. Cayman Islands Tourism confirmed on March 8, 2008, that the NFL officially discontinued the competition indefinitely.

Winners
1990     Ken O'Brien
1991     Dan Marino
1992     Dan Marino
1993     Jeff Hostetler
1994     Randall Cunningham
1995     Randall Cunningham
1996     Neil O'Donnell
1997     Vinny Testaverde
1998     Jim Harbaugh
1999     Jake Plummer
2000     Jake Plummer
2001     Trent Dilfer
2002     Jeff Garcia
2003     Brad Johnson
2004     Matt Hasselbeck
2005     Jake Delhomme
2006     Chris Simms
2007     Josh McCown

References

ESPN original programming
Quarterback Challenge
Recurring events established in 1990
Sports entertainment
Recurring events disestablished in 2007